The 2021 Arab Women's Cup is an international women's football tournament held in Egypt from 24 August to 6 September 2021. The eight national teams involved in the tournament were required to register a squad of up to 24 players, including three goalkeepers. Only players in these squads were eligible to take part in the tournament.

The age listed for each player is on 24 August 2021, the first day of the tournament. The numbers of caps and goals listed for each player do not include any matches played after the start of tournament. The club listed is the club for which the player last played a competitive match prior to the tournament. The nationality for each club reflects the national association (not the league) to which the club is affiliated. A flag is included for coaches who are of a different nationality than their own national team.

Group A

Egypt 
Coach: Mohamad Kamal Atieh Ismail

Lebanon 
Coach: Wael Gharzeddine

Sudan 
Coach: Farouk Gabra

Tunisia 
Coach: Samir Landolssi

Group B

Algeria 
Coach: Radia Fertoul

Jordan 
Coach:  David Nascimento

Palestine 
Coach: Simon Khair

Notes

References 

Squads
Arab Women's Cup squads